Xylocolaelaps is a genus of mites in the family Laelapidae.

Species
 Xylocolaelaps burgetti Royce & Krantz, 2003

References

Laelapidae